Shingaku (心学, lit. "heart learning") or Sekimon-shingaku (石門心学) is a Japanese religious movement, founded by Ishida Baigan and further developed by Teshima Toan, which was especially influential during the Tokugawa period. 
Shingaku has been characterized as coming from a Neo-Confucian tradition, integrating principles from Zen Buddhism and Shinto. (Chang 2010) It has been speculated, Shingaku was one of the cultural foundations for Japan's industrialization. (Sawada, 1993; Bellah, 1957)

References
 Kun-Chiang Chang. "Comparison between the Sekimon Shingaku 石門心學 and Yomeigaku 陽明學 in Japan" 清華學報 40.4 (2010)
Janine Anderson Sawada, Confucian Values and Popular Zen: Sekimon Shingaku in Eighteenth-Century Japan. Honolulu: The University of Hawaii. Press, 1993. . from   
speech in honor of the 250th anniversary of the Founding of Shingaku
 Robert N. Bellah, Tokugawa Religion: The Values of Pre-Industrial Japan, 1957

Confucianism in Japan